Odon de Bénac was an eleventh-century Catholic Bishop of Oloron in France.

The son of Count Raymond II of Bigorre, he was bishop from 1083AD to 1101AD.

References 

Bishops of Oloron
11th-century French Roman Catholic bishops